Viivi Luik (born 6 November 1946, in Tänassilma, Estonia) is an Estonian writer and poet.

Life
From 1965 to 1967, Luik studied at the Tallinn extramural secondary school, working at the same time as a librarian. In 1970, Luik joined the Estonian Writers' Union. In 1974, Luik married Jaak Jõerüüt, another Estonian writer and later diplomat. As the wife of a diplomat, she has spent several years abroad: in Helsinki (1993–1997), Berlin (1996) and Rome (1998–2003).

Works
Luik's first poem appeared in the local daily in 1962, and in 1964 she debuted in the prominent literary magazine Looming. Her first collection of poetry, Pilvede püha (Holiday of Clouds), was published in 1965.

 1965 Pilvede püha (poetry)
 1966 Taevaste tuul (poetry)
 1968 Hääl (poetry)
 1968 Lauludemüüja (poetry)
 1971 Ole kus oled (poetry)
 1973 Pildi sisse minek (poetry)
 1974 Leopold (children's book)
 1978 Russian translation, Леопольд, Tallinn
 1974 Salamaja piir (short story)
 1974 Vaatame, mis Leopold veel räägib (children's book)
 1975 Põliskevad (poetry)
 1976 Leopold aitab linnameest (children's book)
 1977 Luulet 1962–1974 (selected poetry)
 1978 Maapäälsed asjad (poetry)
 1979 Tubased lapsed (children's book)
 1985 Russian translation, Домашние дети, Tallinn
 1982 Rängast rõõmust (poetry)
 1984 Kõik lood Leopoldist (children's book)
 1984 Russian translation, Все рассказы о Леопольде, Tallinn
 1985 Seitsmes rahukevad (novel)
 1985 Russian translation, Седьмая мирная весна, Tallinn
 1986 Finnish translation, Seitsemäs rauhan kevät, Helsinki (2nd edition 1987)
 1988 Swedish translation, Den sjunde fredsvaren, Bromma
 1988 Norwegian translation, Den sjuande fredsvåren, Oslo
 1989 Ukrainian translation, Сьома весна без війни, Kiev
 1991 German translation, Der siebte Friedensfrühling, Reinbek bei Hamburg
 1992 French translation, Le septième printemps de la paix
 1993 Spanish translation, La séptima primavera de la paz, Barcelona
 1995 Latvian translation, Septītais miera pavasaris, Riga
 2008 Hill Mari translation, Шӹмшӹ тыр шошым, Цикмä
 2018 Hungarian translation, A béke hetedik tavasza, Budapest
 1987 Kolmed tähed (children's book)
 1991 Ajaloo ilu (novel)
 1991 Finnish translation, Historian kauneus, Helsinki
 1991 Danish translation, Historiens skønhed, København
 1992 Dutch translation, De schoonheid der geschiedenis, Breda
 1992 Russian translation, Красота истории
 1993 Swedish translation, Historiens förfärande skönhet, Stockholm
 1994 Norwegian translation, Skremmande vakkert, Oslo
 1995 German translation, Die Schönheit der Geschichte, Reinbek bei Hamburg
 1995 Latvian translation, Vēstures skaistums, Riga
 1998 Icelandic translation, Tælandi fegurd sögunnar, Reykjavik
 1998 Hungarian translation, A történelem szépsége, Budapest
 2001 French translation, La beauté de l'histoire, Paris
 2005 Catalan translation, La bellesa de la Història, Barcelona
 2007 English translation, The beauty of history, Norwich
 2010 Albanian translation, E bukura e historisë, Shkup
 1998 Inimese kapike (essays)
 2012 French translation, Le petit placard de l'homme, Paris
 1998 Maa taevas, luulet 1962–1990 (selected poetry)
 2005 Elujoon: valitud luuletused 1962–1997 (selected poetry)
 2006 Aabitsajutud (children's book)
 2006 Tubased lapsed (poetry)
 2006 Kõne koolimaja haual: artiklid ja esseed 1998–2006 (collected articles and essays)
 2006 Kogutud luuletused 1962–1997 (collected poetry; 2nd edition 2011)
 2010 Varjuteater (novel)
 2011 Finnish translation, Varjoteatteri, Helsinki
 2017 Hungarian translation, Árnyékszínház, Budapest
 2017 Latvian translation, Ēnu teātris, Riga
 2018 German translation, Schattenspiel, Göttingen
 2010 Ma olen raamat (with Hedi Rosma)
 2013 Latvian translation, Es esmu grāmata, Riga
 2014 Aastasaja lõpp on aastasaja algus (poetry)
 2017 Pildi ilu rikkumise paratamatus (essays and articles)

Awards 
 1986 A. H. Tammsaare Literary Prize (for the novel Seitsmes rahukevad)
 1988 Juhan Liiv Poetry Award
 1992 Cultural Award of the Republic of Estonia
 2000 Order of the White Star, 3rd Class
 2019 Estonian National Lifetime Achievement Award for Culture
 2020 Jaan Kross Literary Award (for the essay and article collection Pildi ilu rikkumise paratamatus)

References

External links
 Official website
Being one with the world i.e. why leave home. An interview by Aija Sakova in Estonian Literary Magazine 2/2018

1946 births
Living people
People from Viljandi Parish
Estonian women poets
Estonian women novelists
Estonian children's writers
Estonian women children's writers
20th-century Estonian novelists
20th-century Estonian poets
21st-century Estonian novelists
21st-century Estonian poets
21st-century Estonian women writers
20th-century Estonian women writers
Recipients of the Order of the White Star, 3rd Class